G.I. Joe Extreme is a line of military-themed toys that was sold in retail from 1995 to 1997. The toys were produced by Kenner following their acquisition by former competitor Hasbro and was intended to succeed the G.I. Joe: A Real American Hero line, which was discontinued the previous year. It was supported by a syndicated animated series that ran for two seasons and a series of comics.

The line features a storyline quite similar to the A Real American Hero line. In a "near-future" continuity, a new G.I. Joe Team fights to stop a rising terrorist organization called S.K.A.R. (short for Soldiers of Khaos, Anarchy and Ruin) and their leader, a mysterious, shrewd, and incredibly powerful military leader only known as Iron Klaw.

Toyline
The title logo was reminiscent of the original G.I. Joe logo from the 1960s and 1970s. The 3.75" scale was discarded in favor of a new 5" scale, which allowed a greater level of detail especially in the facial and muscular features.

Carded figures were released in two varieties, basic figures and deluxe figures. The deluxe versions of the figures, which were advertised as featuring "Ultra SLAM Firepower", came packaged with a backpack accessory connected to a missile launcher via a tube. The launcher shoots its missiles by lowering the plunger on the backpack. A single two-pack was also released. The vehicles and playsets were also advertised with "Ultra SLAM Firepower".

The Extreme line never approached the success of the Real American Hero line and was canceled after its first wave. A second wave of figures and playsets was showcased in Toy Fair '96, but only two figures (Black Dragon and Harpoon) were given full releases. The rest, which included Mayday (the sole female Joe in the Extreme lineup), were shelved.

Carded figures 
 Basic figures
 Lt. Stone
 Mayday
 Black Dragon
 Metalhead
 Quick Stryke
 Harpoon
 Ballistic
 Sgt. Savage
 Freight
 Iron Klaw
 Inferno
 Rampage
 Steel Raven
 Wreckage
 Deluxe figures
 Lt. Stone with Mortar Launcher
 Iron Klaw with Attack Rocket
 Ballistic with Sidearm Blaster
 Metal Head with Shoulder Cannon
 Two-pack
 Lt. Stone vs. Iron Klaw

Vehicles and playsets 
 Heavy Artillery sets
 Detonator combat cannon with Sgt. Savage figure 
 Spitfire battering platform with Inferno figure
 Vehicles
 Road Bullet assault cycle 
 Sky Stalker
 Sand Striker all terrain vehicle
 Bone Splitter armored tank

Other toys
 Die-cast vehicles - A set of four small scale versions of vehicles from the main toyline. Also came packaged with a compass.
 Water Blaster - A G.I. Joe-themed Super Soaker that straps onto one's arm.

Unreleased products 
 Carded figures
 Mayday
 Quick Stryke
 Rampage
 Wreckage
 Deluxe Freight
 Deluxe Wreckage
 Urban 4-Pack (included urban-themed repaints of Lt. Stone, Sgt. Savage, Freight and Metal Head)
 Heavy Artillery set
 Ice Station Zero
 Vehicles
 Thunderin' Fury tank with Freight
 Tigerhawk
 Action packs (accessory packs for action figures)
 Alpine Enforcer
 Cybernetic Exo-Armor
 Shadow Stealth Defender
 Other products
 Carrying Case
 Combat Communicators (role-playing toy)

Animated series 

The G.I. Joe Extreme series was produced by Sunbow Entertainment (who co-produced the first G.I. Joe TV series), Graz Entertainment and Gunther-Wahl Productions and distributed by Claster Television. The program was part of a checkerboard series of cartoons Claster sold to stations under the umbrella title of The Power Block. 

Set in the (at the time) "near future" of 2006, the show's main threat is a new, emerging terrorist organization called S.K.A.R. led by Iron Klaw, disguised as the former count of an eastern European country, whose identity he took over after kidnapping him.

According to the one-minute intro (which resembles a news flash), a "former super-power" has collapsed with several factions vying for control against a new global terrorist organization "known only as S.K.A.R." whose goal is nothing less than total world domination. Iron Klaw claims: "We will be VICTORIOUS!" to which Lt. Stone replies "Not on MY watch!" followed by an introduction to the new Joe roster. 

The opening concludes with a news reporter giving odds of survival as "a million to 1" and Stone yelling: "...and that's the way we LIKE it!" Season 1 with a one-minute intro with all of the live-action segments during the beginning of all the episodes, Season 2 with a thirty-second intro during Friday's The Power Block.

The new Joe team operates in a post-Cold War world wracked by chaos and carnage, and battling against both SKAR and independent mercenaries, who seek to further destabilize an already unstable world. Unlike the previous series, the cartoon featured a pre-credits teaser featuring a mixture of both live actors with the voices dubbed over and CGI. However, as with the previous series, the end of the episode featured new public service announcements in the same vein as the popular "Knowing is Half the Battle" PSAs.

Comics 

Dark Horse Comics acquired the G.I. Joe comic license in 1996. The initial four issue mini-series, simply titled G.I. Joe (which featured the tagline "extreme times call for extreme heroes!" on the cover of each issue), was written by Mike W. Barr, with art by Tatsuya Ishida and Scott Reed. The cover to the first issue (The Hour of the Iron Claw) was done by Frank Miller, the second issue (Pawn of the Iron Klaw) by Norm Breyfogle, and issues three (The Gang's All Here) and four (The Ultimate Price) by Walter Simonson. The plot of the mini-series revealed events that occurred after the ones depicted in the television series, but also contradict them on several points, notably in that Iron Klaw is, at the very beginning, the second-in-command of the military wing of S.K.A.R. The original leader was a woman named The Duchess of M'Klavia, who wanted her royal line to regain control of her country’s government through whatever means necessary. She was assassinated by Iron Klaw, when he became more ambitious and craved for world domination. At this point, the new Joe Team included two new members, Short Fuze (unrelated to the character of the same codename from the A Real American Hero series) and Tall Sally.

The mini-series led to an ongoing series following the same continuity, and beginning with a three-part story: (Red Scream: Hunted, Red Scream: Shakes Hands with Satan, Red Scream: Island Assault). The plot featured an anti-globalist group led by a woman called Red Scream, who sought to discredit (and eventually destroy) the Inter-Alliance, by using Joe impostors to commit acts of terrorism. The storyline concluded with both Red Scream's and Iron Klaw's capture. A fourth issue (All This and World War II and The Last Wild Heart: The Fourth Man) began a new story following the still-active remnants of the I.R.O.N. Army, but the comic was put on an indefinite "hiatus", and publication never resumed.

Characters

G.I. Joe Team
 Mr. Clancy (voiced by Campbell Lane) - He is the Joe Team's presidential liaison and the true team leader, very much like General Flagg in the original series. He dresses in a black suit and is always wearing sunglasses, resembling the men in black.
 Lt. Stone (voiced by Garry Chalk) - Field commander. After foiling an attempted kidnapping by S.K.A.R. soldiers, both he and Sgt. Savage were approached by Mr. Clancy to form a new G.I. Joe Team.
 Sgt. Savage (voiced by Michael Dobson) - Master Sergeant Robert S. Savage, Jr. was the only character carried over from A Real American Hero, as he was part of the short-lived Sgt. Savage and his Screaming Eagles subline. Savage is the "oldest" member of the team; he once had a wife and child.
 Ballistic/Eagle Eye (voiced by Brian Drummond) - Albert Salviatti is the team's sharp shooter. He has a strong rivalry with his former comrade-in-arms, the Silencer. He's referred to as "the guy who never misses".  His codename was inexplicably changed in Season 2.
 Black Dragon (voiced by Tony Lung in Season 1, Terry Klassen in season 2) - Kang Chi Lee is the Joe Team's resident ninja and martial artist. He is from Hong Kong (as revealed in "The Search for Clancy") and has a history with a crime family from that area.
 Freight (voiced by Blu Mankuma) - Omar Diesel is a former professional football player and the team's demolitions expert. Freight served in the U.S. Army before becoming a football player. He left football when he heard about the reformation of the Joe Team (as seen in "Crawling from the Wreckage" and "Winner Take All").
 Harpoon (voiced by Francisco Trujillo) - Jose Montalvo is a former Navy SEAL and the team's nautical expert (as seen in "Dawn's Oily Light"). He provides comic relief for the G.I. Joe team.
 Mayday (voiced by Randall Carpenter) - Mayday is the lone female of the reformed Joe Team. She is an aggressive and determined skilled fighter and pilot.
 Metalhead (voiced by Matt Hill) - Matthew Hurley is the team's communications and computer expert and hacker. He was the first person recruited to join the new Joe Team (as seen in "Summoning of Heroes"). He is unrelated to the Iron Grenadier member who was introduced in A Real American Hero line.
 Quick Stryke (voiced by Blu Mankuma) - A former S.K.A.R. operative who defected to the Joe Team after the death of his brother Jonathan (as seen in "Point of Honor").
 Red McKnox (voiced by Dale Wilson) - A scientist of Scottish descent who designed most of the equipment used by the Joe Team.
 Tracker - Tracker is an expert tracker recruited by Stone, in order to find Clancy. Tracker possesses extra-sensory perception (as seen in "The Search for Clancy").
 Lakota - Tracker's trained wolf.
 Short-Fuze - A member of the Joe Team, appearing only in the comic series. He is an expert in demolitions, unrelated to the original one from A Real American Hero series.
 Tall Sally - A second female character appearing only in the comic series. "Sally" is a nickname short for Salindra.

S.K.A.R.
 Iron Klaw (voiced by Richard Newman) - The leader of the military wing of S.K.A.R. He has a fascination and deep respect for Genghis Khan (as seen in "Relics", "Rebellion", and "The Search for Clancy"). Iron Klaw operates under the alias of Count von Rani, the ruler of a small Eastern European nation called Kalistan who he kidnapped and stole the identity of.
 Steel Raven (voiced by Elizabeth Carol Savenkoff) - Iron Klaw's right-hand woman, Steel Raven becomes the main instrument of his will by the second season of the TV show.
 Inferno (voiced by Ian James Corlett) - Kidwell Pyre served Iron Klaw throughout the first season of the television series. Inferno grew up as the adopted son of a poor single mother who worked as a maid while his two brothers Miles and Fredwick bullied him at an early age. Refers to his arm-mounted flamethrowers as his "Toys" and talks with a hissing voice.
 Wreckage (voiced by Dale Wilson) - He was once a soldier named Eric Alexander who fought alongside Freight in the American military until he went M.I.A. In reality, Wreckage was experimented upon in an early attempt by Iron Klaw to create a cybernetic super-soldier when he was captured during a major military conflict in South America (as seen in "Crawling from the Wreckage"). The experiments made Wreckage extremely strong and resilient, but prone to fits of rage.
 Rampage (voiced by Colin Murdock) - J. Remington III is an arms manufacturer who operates legitimate business fronts and black market deals. Rampage is S.K.A.R.'s primary weapon supplier. However, he seeks to eliminate Iron Klaw and seize control of the organization. Rampage possesses the ability to transform into a grotesque devilish green-skinned creature (as seen in "Crawling from the Wreckage" and "Extend a Helping Klaw"). In addition when he's in battle, he also wears high-tech armor with guns on it that often vary from a chain-gun to a rocket launcher.
 Duchess of Mklavia - The former leader of the military wing of S.K.A.R., the Duchess appears only in the first comic series. Iron Klaw assassinated her to replace her as head of both Kalistan and S.K.A.R.
 S.K.A.R. Soldiers - The robotic foot soldiers of S.K.A.R.

Non-aligned villains
 The Silencer (voiced by David Kaye) - Although not technically a member of S.K.A.R., the Silencer is often found in their employ. He is a freelance mercenary known for his marksmanship. The Silencer used to be a member of the U.S. Special Forces serving with Ballistic (Eagle Eye). However, he was court-martialed for his actions and thrown out of the military.
 Red Scream - Appearing only in the comic series, Red Scream is an anti-globalist terrorist who sought to destroy the Inter-Alliance by discrediting the Joe Team through the use of imposters. Her identity was later revealed to be Commander Roston, an American military officer with access to the Joe Team's files.

Voices
 Randall Carpenter - Mayday
 Garry Chalk - Lt. Stone
 Ian James Corlett - Inferno
 Michael Dobson - Sgt. Savage
 Brian Drummond - Eagle Eye/Ballistic
 Matt Hill - Metalhead
 Terry Klassen - Black Dragon (Season 2)
 Tony Lung - Black Dragon (Season 1)
 Blu Mankuma - Freight, Quick Stryke
 Colin Murdock - Rampage
 Richard Newman - Iron Klaw
 Elizabeth Carol Savenkoff - Steel Raven
 Francisco Trujillo - Harpoon
 Dale Wilson - Red McKnox, Wreckage

Additional voices
 Kathleen Barr -
 Lisa Ann Beley -
 A.J. Bond -
 Roger Cross -
 John Kirk Connell - 
 Christopher Gray -
 Saffron Henderson -
 David Kaye - The Silencer
 Ken Kramer -
 Kyle Labine -
 Andrea Libman -
 Chris Turner -

Crew
 Susan Blu - Voice Director

References

External links
 G.I. Joe Extreme at Dark Horse Comics
 G.I. Joe Extreme at YOJOE.com
 

G.I. Joe comics
1990s toys
Action figures
Hasbro products
Television series by Hasbro Studios
1990s American animated television series
1995 American television series debuts
1997 American television series endings
Extreme
First-run syndicated television programs in the United States
Television series set in 2006
Television series set in the future
American children's animated action television series
American children's animated adventure television series
Television series by Sunbow Entertainment
Television series by Claster Television